Damlamaca (also, Damlamadzha) is a former village in the Gobustan Rayon of Azerbaijan. The village formed part of the municipality of Cəmcəmli.

References 

Populated places in Gobustan District